The Cycling Embassy of Denmark (CED) is a Danish network organization dedicated to the promotion of cycling as a means of transportation and Denmark as a cycling nation by capitalizing on the deep rooted Danish cycling culture to offer solutions to urban planners across Europe and the world in the areas of urban planning, bicycle infrastructure development, and cycling promotion.

History
The CED was founded on 12 May 2009 during the 2009 Velo-city conference in Brussels.  The Danish ambassador to Belgium, Jørgen Molde, conducted an inauguration ceremony that attracted the attention of the Danish and international press as well as politicians and urban planners in attendance at Velo-city.

Network
The CED comprises a network of Danish cities, companies and associations, including:
The municipality of Copenhagen
The municipality of Frederiksberg
The municipality of Odense
The municipality of Aalborg
The municipality of Aarhus
The municipality of Middelfart
The municipality of Randers
Aros Kommunikation
Danish Cyclists' Federation
Reelight
Velorbis
Veksø A/S
COWI A/S
Gehl Architects
Danish Cancer Society
DSB (railway company)
Atkins Danmark
Rambøll
Gottlieb Paludan Architects

Leadership Award for Cycling Promotion
During the 2009 United Nations Climate Change Conference, the CED awarded New York City mayor Mike Bloomberg the first ever Leadership Award for Cycling Promotion.

In 2010, Roelof Wittink was awarded with the Leadership Award for Cycling Promotion during the Velo-city Global conference in Copenhagen.

See also
 Cycling in Denmark
 Danish Cyclists Federation
 Cycling in Copenhagen

References

External links
Cycling Embassy of Denmark

Cycling in Denmark